Uğur Uçar (born 5 April 1987) is a Turkish professional footballer who plays as a right back.

Career
Uçar is a product of the Galatasaray youth system. He made his first team debut on 7 March 2004 against Adanaspor. He spent the 2006–07 season on loan at Kayserispor, playing in 22 matches. Upon his return to Galatasaray in 2007, Uçar became the first choice right back, playing in 26 matches before injuring his right knee in a match against Konyaspor on 18 February 2008. The injury kept him from competitive play for 15 months, making his return on 30 May 2009 against Sivasspor. Uçar played in 20 matches the following season.

He was transferred to Ankaragücü for a fee of €1.3 million on 23 June 2010.

Career statistics

Club

Honours

Galatasaray
Süper Lig: 2005–06, 2007–08
Turkish Super Cup: 2008

İstanbul Başakşehir
Süper Lig: 2019–20

References

External links
 
 

1987 births
People from Bakırköy
Footballers from Istanbul
Living people
Association football fullbacks
Turkish footballers
Turkey youth international footballers
Turkey under-21 international footballers
Turkey B international footballers
Galatasaray A2 footballers
Galatasaray S.K. footballers
Kayserispor footballers
MKE Ankaragücü footballers
Kardemir Karabükspor footballers
İstanbul Başakşehir F.K. players
Pendikspor footballers
Süper Lig players
TFF Second League players
21st-century Turkish people